Kubice may refer to the following places in Poland:

 Kubice, Masovian Voivodeship
 Kubice, Opole Voivodeship